The South Wales Coalfield extends across Pembrokeshire, Carmarthenshire, Swansea, Neath Port Talbot, Bridgend, Rhondda Cynon Taf, Merthyr Tydfil, Caerphilly, Blaenau Gwent and Torfaen. It is rich in coal deposits, especially in the South Wales Valleys.

Description

It comprises a fully exposed synclinorium with a varying thickness of coal measures (Upper Carboniferous/Pennsylvanian) with thick, workable seams in the lower parts and generally thinner and sparser seams in the upper parts, together with a development of sandstones (Pennant Sandstone). These sandstones have been much used in building construction (including the characteristic terraces of former miners' houses) and give rise to bleak uplands rising 300–600 metres above sea level between the steep-sided valleys in which most deep mines were developed.

The coal generally increases in grade or "rank" from east to west, with bituminous coals in the east, and anthracite in the west, mostly to the north and west of Neath. The Rhondda Valley was particularly known for steam coals which fuelled steamships of the 19th and early 20th centuries.

History

Industrial and transport expansion
Ways along the valley floors provided the main routes for exporting coal south to ports and docks such as Newport Docks, Cardiff Docks and Barry Docks.

Early mining activity was mainly by levels or adits driven into coal seams from outcrops in the valley sides. Development of the coalfield proceeded very actively from about 1850, when deep mining became significant in the previously entirely rural Rhondda Valley. Coal was moved from mines on tramways to canals such as the Swansea Canal and Glamorganshire Canal. These were supplemented, and then superseded, by numerous competing railways which fed the docks at Swansea, Cardiff, Newport, Llanelli and Barry.

Iron ore was also extracted from the coal measures, principally from the north crop area (including Merthyr Tydfil and Blaenavon). The availability of coal and nearby limestone (as a flux) gave rise to a substantial local iron and steel industry which was perpetuated in the 20th century by the location of modern steelworks at Ebbw Vale, Newport and Cardiff and Port Talbot. These used imported iron ore.

Decline
Coal fuelling of Royal Navy ships was increasingly challenged from 1904 when strategists including Admiral "Jacky" Fisher and, later, Winston Churchill successfully argued for oil-firing of the steam engines in new ships. Oil, having higher energy density than coal, allowed larger and faster warships, and being easily piped, was easier to supply to ships at sea.

By the start of World War I, both the Queen Elizabeth-class and the Revenge-class battleships were partly oil-fired: oil was used mainly for both quick-start steaming, and sprayed on burning coal to extend their range. A number of cruiser and destroyer classes produced since 1904 also used oil. However, by the time of the Battle of Jutland in May/June 1916 still only a sixth of the Grand Fleet was oil-fired. Further, that summer the British suffered a number of losses of oil tankers, and had to instruct oil-fired ships to restrict their fuel consumption and hence speed. When the United States entered the war in April 1917, the British instructed the United States Navy to send only coal-fired ships to assist them. To assist the Royal Navy, from the outset of the war the Government and railway companies ran what were termed "Jellicoe Specials", high-speed coal carrying freight trains that ran from South Wales to north-east Scotland, and then by ship to Scapa Flow. Initially running to Dingwall, they then were also shipped to Scrabster through Thurso. However, inadequate capacity in port and rail facilities at these locations meant that from January 1915, all naval ordnance (other than ammunition) and medical supplies were sent by rail to Aberdeen, and from mid-1915 Grangemouth. By the end of WWI, the Royal Navy had 33 dreadnoughts and 9 battle cruisers, with 10 and 2 respectively entirely oil fuelled.

However, after WWI, the move to oil-firing was quickly extended to other areas, including the railways, which was a key strategic factor in the economic hardship which struck the coalfield after the war. Coal workings were over-expanded in the late nineteenth century, and the Welsh coal owners had failed to invest in mechanisation. By the inter-war period the South Wales Coalfield had the lowest productivity, highest costs and smallest profits in Britain. Hardship continued through the 1926 general strike, the great depression of the 1930s, World War II and thereafter. The 1937 novel The Citadel and the 1939 novel How Green Was My Valley (later filmed, with a wildly inaccurate "colliery village") describe such hardship, as do the poems of Idris Davies the miner, teacher and poet of Rhymney.

Following the general collapse of the UK coal industry, most pits closed during the 1980s, with factors such as exhaustion of reserves and geological complexity adding to their problems. The last deep mine, at Tower Colliery on the north crop, ceased mining in January 2008. However, a few small licensed mines continue to work seams, mostly from outcrop, on the hillsides. Although some areas of the coalfield are effectively worked out, considerable reserves remain. However, the geological difficulties, which resulted in the closure of (for instance) Nantgarw colliery, make the cost of significant further extraction high. The coalfield experienced a late-stage development when opencast mining was commenced on a large scale, mostly on the gently-dipping north crop. In addition, old tips were reclaimed for their small coal content, which could be burned in power stations such as nearby Aberthaw. Most of the old sites have been filled and landscaped, but new operations continue.

Following the Aberfan disaster of 1966, when a coal-tip slurry flow buried a school, mine-waste tips, which had been piled precariously on hilltops in many cases, were extensively regraded and reclaimed. This work continues. Landslipping of the steep valley slopes, and subsidence caused by the coal extraction, have also posed problems.

Minor revival
A subsidiary of Western Coal (which mainly operates in the British Columbia and West Virginia coalfields), Energybuild plc, worked a drift mine near the old Tower Colliery, the Aberpergwm Colliery, until production was suspended in July 2015. The mine produced high quality anthracite, and was sold primarily to Aberthaw power station and Port Talbot Steelworks and into the wholesale and retail sized coal markets. Energybuild also operates the Nant y Mynydd opencast coal site nearby.

Sociology and demography of the South Wales Coalfield

Population change
As the mines and other industries rapidly expanded throughout the coalfield, nearby towns also expanded to meet the demand for labour. In the first half of the nineteenth century, the development of ironworks saw the population of Merthyr Tydfil, in the northern part of the coalfield, increase from 7,700 in 1801 to 49,794 in 1861, making it the largest town in Wales. As Cardiff and other ports in South Wales grew to meet the demands for exporting iron, steel and coal in the later part of the nineteenth century, valleys that had previously been sparsely inhabited suddenly increased in population. The Rhondda valley grew from less than a thousand people in 1851 to more than 150,000 in 1911.

Between 1881 and 1911, Glamorgan became the most industrialised part of Wales and saw inward migration of more than 330,000 people from elsewhere in Wales, neighbouring parts of England and further afield.

The coal mines were employing 250,000 men by 1921, but this was the peak and in subsequent decades the overseas market began to shrink. By 1930, employment in the mines was half of that in 1920 as mechanisation increased leading to a net loss of 314,000 people between 1921 and 1935.

Accidents and safety
The South Wales Coalfield was notorious for the number of fatal accidents in the 19th century.

Risca Black Vein accidents
The Risca Black Vein colliery had many fatal accidents to the extent that it became known as the "death pit".

The two biggest accidents at the Black Vein pit were in 1860, when 146 died, and in 1880 when 119 people died.

Prince of Wales disaster

The Prince of Wales colliery in Abercarn exploded in 1878 causing 268 deaths.

Llanerch Colliery disaster
The Llanerch Colliery in Abersychan exploded in 1890 causing 176 deaths.

Albion Colliery disaster
The Albion Colliery in Cilfynydd exploded in 1894 causing 276 deaths.

In the 20th century there were numerous further fatal accidents.

Universal Colliery disaster

The Universal Colliery in Senghenydd had Britain's worst mining accident when it exploded in 1913 killing 431.

Aberfan disaster

In 1966, 116 children and 28 adults were killed in Aberfan when a coal spoil tip collapsed onto them.

Gleision Colliery 

On 15 September 2011, seven miners were working a narrow seam at the Gleision Colliery drift mine in the Tawe Valley, near Swansea, when a sudden ingress of water filled the passage in which they were working. Three miners were immediately able to escape to the surface. Despite extensive efforts to rescue the remaining miners, on 16 September South Wales Police confirmed that all four had died.

Miners' health
Coal mining in the South Wales Coalfield was a dangerous occupation with lifelong health implications.

Between 1849 and 1853, miners over the age of 25 in the Merthyr Tydfil district were found to have a life expectancy of around 20 years lower than in other mining areas of England and Wales.

In the 1930s, mine owners became concerned about the adverse health effects of coal dust and the amount it was costing them to compensate miners working at the coalface. Pneumoconiosis proved to be a particular problem for miners in South Wales, accounting for almost 90% of the total cases for the whole of the UK in both 1939 and 1945, and with more than 25% of the South Wales mining labour force affected between 1959 and 1963.

Women's roles
Women in South Wales were often not economically active in the second half of the nineteenth century due to the Mines and Collieries Act 1842 which prohibited women from working underground. It has been suggested that this explains the lower marriage age and higher fertility of women in the coalfield.

See also
Coal mining
History of coal mining
1926 United Kingdom general strike
UK miners' strike (1984–85)
Miners' institute
List of British coalfields

References

External links
 Welsh Coal Mines - all the histories of all the pits
 BBC Wales feature on Coal in South Wales
 

Coal mining in Wales
Coal mining regions in Wales